Liberty Osaka (formerly the Osaka Human Rights Museum) is a museum dedicated to human rights situated in Naniwa-ku, a ward in south Osaka City. As the first general museum dedicated to human rights in Japan, the focus of its permanent exhibits is the history of the struggle against discrimination experienced by the nation's minority ethnic groups; the Burakumin, the Ainu of Hokkaidō, the Ryukyuans of Okinawa and Japan's communities of Korean and Chinese descent. There are also exhibits dedicated to discrimination issues affecting women, lesbians, gays, bisexuals, and transgender people, the physically challenged, and the survivors of the atomic bombing of Hiroshima and Nagasaki (hibakusha). Founded in December 1985 to document the history of the Osaka human rights movement, it was relaunched in December 1995 as the Osaka Jinken Hakubutsu-kan (Human Rights Museum).

Entrance is ¥250 and ¥150 for college and high school students and ¥500 and ¥300 respectively for special exhibits. Entrance is free for elementary and middle school students, senior citizens aged 65 and over, and physically challenged individuals, also from 4 to 10 December. ("Human Rights Week", established after Human Rights Day.) Audio guides are available in both Japanese and English.

The museum is open from 10:00 a.m. – 5:00 p.m.; last entrance is at 4:30 p.m. It is closed every Monday (except on public holidays), days following a public holiday, the 4th Friday of the month and New Year's Day. The nearest train stations are Ashiharabashi and Imamiya (Osaka Loop Line).

External links 
Liberty Osaka

Museums in Osaka
Human rights organizations based in Japan
Museums established in 1985
Human rights museums
1985 establishments in Japan